Lompoc High School is a public high school serving Lompoc, in northern Santa Barbara County, California, United States.  It was first established in the small farming community in 1892. It is part of the Lompoc Unified School District, as is crosstown rival Cabrillo High.

Performance
The school achieved an API index of 692 in 2009.

Notable alumni

Julián Araujo, defender for Major League Soccer's LA Galaxy and the Mexico national football team
Mike Bratz, former professional basketball player (San Antonio Spurs, Cleveland Cavaliers, Chicago Bulls, Golden State Warriors, Sacramento Kings, Phoenix Suns) 
Russ Bolinger, former NFL player for Detroit Lions and Los Angeles Rams and an NFL scout for 18 years
Rex Caldwell, professional golfer on PGA Tour, Nationwide Tour and Champions Tour
Casey Candaele, former Major League Baseball player who played for Montreal Expos, Houston Astros and Cleveland Indians
Kelly Candeale,  “A League of Their Own” by Kim Wilson and Kelly Candaele; Kelly wrote and produced PBS documentary on All-American Girls Professional Baseball League, in which his mother and aunt played; son of Helen Callaghan Candaele St. Aubin, center fielder in AAGPBL.
Sheldon Canley, professional football player for NFL's San Francisco 49ers
Ryan Church, former professional baseball player
Lavon Coleman, professional running back in the NFL
Gunther Cunningham, assistant head coach-linebackers for NFL's Tennessee Titans; former head coach of Kansas City Chiefs
Johnnie Gray, professional football player for NFL's Green Bay Packers
Roy Howell, professional baseball player for MLB's  Toronto Blue Jays
Boo Jackson, MAC quarterback for Ohio University
Napoleon Kaufman, professional football player for NFL's Oakland Raiders
Joel Smith, Washington Huskies Pac-12 basketball guard
Dave Stegman, professional baseball player for MLB's Chicago White Sox
Roy Thomas, professional baseball player for MLB's Seattle Mariners

References

External links
Lompoc High School
GreatSchools Inc.

Public high schools in California
High schools in Santa Barbara County, California
1892 establishments in California